The Tongue River Member is the uppermost geologic member of the Fort Union Formation in Montana, North Dakota, Wyoming.  The strata are yellow or light-colored massive sandstones and numerous thick coal beds. 

The vertebrate fossil fauna includes fishes, turtles, crocodiles, and mammals. Mammalian genera known from rocks of both the Torrejonian and the Tiffanian land mammal ages (middle and late Paleocene) are present.

See also

 List of fossiliferous stratigraphic units in North Dakota
 Paleontology in North Dakota
 Paleontology in Wyoming

References

Paleogene Montana
Paleogene geology of North Dakota